The I. I. Rabi Prize in Atomic, Molecular, and Optical Physics is given by the American Physical Society to recognize outstanding work by mid-career researchers in the field of atomic, molecular, and optical physics. The award was endowed in 1989 in honor of the physicist I. I. Rabi and has been awarded biannually since 1991.

The prize citation reads:

Recipients
 2021 Monika Schleier-Smith: "For seminal work in quantum optics and for discoveries at the intersection of AMO, condensed matter, and quantum information, including original contributions to spin squeezing in optical cavities, engineering long-range interactions for quantum simulations, and metrology, and for theoretical development of a measurement protocol related to the scrambling of quantum information."
 2019 Kang-Kuen Ni: "For seminal work on ultracold molecules, including original contributions to the understanding of chemical reactions in the quantum regime, deterministic creation of individual molecules with optical tweezers, and development of novel, high-precision techniques to interrogate and control the complete set of internal molecular resources."
 2017 Martin Zwierlein: "For seminal studies of ultracold Fermi gases, including precision measurements of the equation of state, the observation of superfluidity, solitons, vortices, and polarons, the realization of a microscope for fermions in a lattice; and the production of chemically stable polar molecules."
 2015 Ian Spielman: "For the development of quantum simulations using ultra-cold atoms, creation of synthetic electromagnetic fields, demonstration of synthetic spinorbit coupling, and applications to studying new physical systems."
 2013 Markus Greiner: "For seminal contributions to the field of ultracold atoms, including the observation of the superfluid-to-Mott-insulator transition, the study of the BEC-BCS cross over for fermions, and the development of imaging techniques for atoms in optical lattices with single-atom resolution"
 2011 Cheng Chin: "For pioneering work in strongly interacting Fermi gas and few body physics including the discovery of the Effimov effect."
 2009 Mikhail Lukin: "For pioneering theoretical and experimental work at the interface between quantum optics, quantum information processing, and the quantum many body problem."
 2007 Jun Ye: "For advances in precision measurement, including techniques for stabilizing and measuring optical frequencies, controlling the phase of femtosecond laser pulses, and measuring molecular transitions."
 2005 Deborah Jin:
 2003 Mark A. Kasevich: "For developing atom interferometer inertial sensors with unprecedented precision, and for pioneering studies of Bose-Einstein condensates, especially the achievement of non-classical spin states and the demonstration of a mode-locked atom laser."
 2001 Christopher Monroe: "For his pivotal experiments that implemented quantum logic using trapped atomic ions, and for his fundamental studies of coherence and decoherence in entangled quantum systems."
 1999 Mark G. Raizen: "For his pioneering advances in the experimental study of atom optics, and especially for the insightful connections he has developed between this discipline and studies of chaotic dynamics, condensed matter physics, and dissipative quantum systems."
 1997 Eric Allin Cornell and Wolfgang Ketterle: "For achieving Bose-Einstein condensation of an atomic gas, for creating techniques for studying the Bose condensate, and for measuring the physical properties of the weakly interacting atomic Bose gas." 
 1995 Randall G. Hulet: "For his contributions to a broad range of important problems in atomic and optical physics including cavity quantum electrodynamics, quantum jumps, ion storage, and laser cooling of atoms. In the latter field, in particular for his demonstration of multiphoton cooling involving Doppleron resonances in neutral Lithium and his collision experiments with cooled Lithium vapor."
 1993 Timothy E. Chupp: "For his contributions to the development of high density polarized noble gases by spin exchange with optically pumped alkali atoms and in particular for his leadership and use of polarized 3He as a target for fundamental experiments in nuclear physics."
 1991 Chris H. Greene: "For his many contributions to atomic and molecular theory including studies of resonance vibronic processes, multiple electron excitations, photo-absorption in external fields, and threshold effects of long range forces."

See also

 List of physics awards
 Arthur L. Schawlow Prize in Laser Science
 Norman F. Ramsey Prize in Atomic, Molecular and Optical Physics, and in Precision Tests of Fundamental Laws and Symmetries

References

External links
 I.I. Rabi Prize in Atomic, Molecular, and Optical Physics (official site)

Awards of the American Physical Society
Atomic physics
Atomic, molecular, and optical physics